The 1934 Ohio gubernatorial election was held on November 6, 1934. Democratic nominee Martin L. Davey defeated Republican nominee Clarence J. Brown with 51.13% of the vote.

General election

Candidates
Major party candidates
Martin L. Davey, Democratic
Clarence J. Brown, Republican 

Other candidates
I. O. Ford, Communist

Results

References

1934
Ohio
Gubernatorial